7th Brigade may refer to:

Australia
7th Brigade (Australia)

Belgium
7th Brigade (Belgium)

Bosnia and Herzegovina
7th Muslim Brigade

Canada
7th Canadian Infantry Brigade

China
7th Armored Brigade (People's Republic of China)

Croatia
7th Guards Brigade (Croatia)

France
7th Armoured Brigade (France)

India
 7th Indian Infantry Brigade, in the Second World War
 7th (Ferozepore) Brigade, in the First World War
 7th Indian Cavalry Brigade, in the First World War

Israel
7th Armored Brigade (Israel)

Lebanon
7th Infantry Brigade (Lebanon)

Poland
7th Coastal Defense Brigade

South Vietnam
 7th Airborne Brigade

Tajikistan
 7th Airborne Assault Brigade

Ukraine
 7th Army Aviation Brigade (Ukraine)
 7th Tactical Aviation Brigade (Ukraine)

United Kingdom
7th Armoured Brigade (United Kingdom)
7th Cavalry Brigade (United Kingdom)
7th Infantry Brigade (United Kingdom)
7th Motor Brigade (United Kingdom)
7th Mounted Brigade (United Kingdom)
7th Support Group (United Kingdom)
 7th Brigade Royal Field Artillery; see 2nd (Rawalpindi) Division
 VII Brigade, Royal Horse Artillery

United States
7th Cavalry Brigade (United States)
 7th Signal Brigade (United States)
7th Transportation Brigade (United States)

See also
 7th Division (disambiguation)